Nigel Trance (born 17 December 1950) is a Filipino weightlifter. He competed in the men's flyweight event at the 1972 Summer Olympics.

References

1950 births
Living people
Filipino male weightlifters
Olympic weightlifters of the Philippines
Weightlifters at the 1972 Summer Olympics
Place of birth missing (living people)
Weightlifters at the 1974 Asian Games
Asian Games competitors for the Philippines
20th-century Filipino people